Cheryl Walker may refer to:

Cheryl Walker (actress) (1918–1971), American actress
Cheryl Lyn Walker, American biologist

See also
Cherryl Walker, South African professor